London Bubble Theatre Company has been animating spaces with community theatre for all, since 1972. Five decades later, its mission of using theatre as a tool to foster equality and connection has never been more important, with Bubble consistently finding ways to reach people who might otherwise not have access to theatre and whose voices continue to be at risk of going unheard. The company celebrates its 50th anniversary year in 2022.

Mission
Bubble Theatre frees people’s creative voices to foster a more connected and equal society.

Artistic Directors
London Bubble's Artistic Directors have been:
 Glen Walford 1972–1974
 Peter Coe 1975
 Glen Walford 1976–1979
 Bob Carlton 1979–1984
 Bob Eaton 1984–1986
 Peter Rowe 1986–1989
 Jonathan Petherbridge 1989–2020
 Marie Vickers 2020–Present Day

History
The original idea behind the Bubble, led by the Greater London Arts Association, was to set up a company that toured outer London to attract new theatre goers into the city. In 1972, founding director Glen Walford took that vision, along with a polyhedral tent, and brought Bubble to life. It began ‘popping up’ in parks and green spaces all over with seasons of original theatre performances for adults and children alike. 

The Company originated Return to the Forbidden Planet for a production in a tent.

Awards
2017 - Arts & Culture London Youth Awards

2019 - SLCN Innovation of The Year Shine a Light Awards

2022 - Best Charity or Social Enterprise Southwark Business Excellence Awards

References

External links
London Bubble Theatre Company website
Cardboard Citizens website
Speech Bubbles website

Theatre companies in London
Theatre companies in the United Kingdom

Charities